Vyacheslav Berduta (born 5 December 1970) is a Kazakhstani judoka. He competed in the men's heavyweight event at the 2000 Summer Olympics.

References

1970 births
Living people
Kazakhstani male judoka
Olympic judoka of Kazakhstan
Judoka at the 2000 Summer Olympics
People from Karaganda Region
Asian Games medalists in judo
Judoka at the 1998 Asian Games
Judoka at the 2002 Asian Games
Asian Games bronze medalists for Kazakhstan
Medalists at the 2002 Asian Games
20th-century Kazakhstani people
21st-century Kazakhstani people